The 1988 Speedway World Pairs Championship was the nineteenth FIM Speedway World Pairs Championship. The final took place in Bradford, England. The championship was won by Denmark (45 points) who beat host team England (41 points) and United States (39 points).

World final
  Bradford, Odsal Stadium

* New Zealand born, Australian rider Alan Rivett replaced injured New Zealand rider David Bargh

See also
 1988 Individual Speedway World Championship
 1988 Speedway World Team Cup
 motorcycle speedway
 1988 in sports

References

Speedway World Pairs Championship
World Pairs
Speedway World Pairs
Sports competitions in Yorkshire